Valley Strong Ballpark is a minor league baseball stadium in Visalia, California. The stadium, formerly known as Recreation Ballpark, currently serves as the home to the Visalia Rawhide of the California League. The Rawhide is an affiliate of the Arizona Diamondbacks.

With only 1,888 seats, plus capacity for another 580 fans on a lawn, it is the smallest MLB-affiliated ballpark.

The ballpark was built by the city of Visalia in 1946. In 2003, the stadium began a six-year renovation and expansion that added a grandstand and more seats on the third-base side. It is one of the oldest active ballparks in Minor League Baseball.

From 2014 to 2018, Valley Strong Ballpark hosted Divisions I-VI of the California Interscholastic Federation Central Section Baseball Championships, before relocating in 2019 to Pete Beiden Field at Bob Bennett Stadium at California State University, Fresno.

References

External links
Recreation Ballpark | Visalia Rawhide Recreation Ballpark
City of Visalia - Recreation Park

Minor league baseball venues
Baseball venues in California
Sports venues in Tulare County, California
Buildings and structures in Visalia, California
Sports in Visalia, California
California League ballparks